Olivia Sanchez was the defending champion, but chose not to participate.

Eleni Daniilidou won the title, defeating Elitsa Kostova in the final, 6–3, 6–2.

Seeds

Main draw

Finals

Top half

Bottom half

References 
 Main draw

Open Diputacion Ciudad de Pozoblanco - Singles
Women
Open Diputación Ciudad de Pozoblanco singles